Marie Wilson (born 20 April 1974) is an Australian singer and songwriter. She was nominated for ARIA Award for Best New Talent and ARIA Award for Breakthrough Artist – Single at the ARIA Music Awards of 1998 and for Breakthrough Artist – Album at the ARIA Music Awards of 1999.

Career
Born in Melbourne, Wilson started playing solo gigs in 1993. She had a series of independent releases before signing with Warner Music in 1997. 

In 1998 she released two singles, "Next Time" and "Won't Keep a Good Girl Down", both of which made the ARIA top 40. An album Real Life was released in October 1998 and reached #7 on the albums chart. 

Real Life was subsequently released in USA in June 1999. 

In 2000, Wilson covered "Me Myself I"  which was the lead song on the movie Me Myself I. She released two more albums, Studio Sessions in 2001 and Heartbreak in 2005, then took a break from music. She later made her return, releasing a song "Extraordinary" in 2013 and followed it up the next year with an album of the same name.

Discography

Studio albums

Live albums

Extended plays

Singles

Awards and nominations

ARIA Awards
The ARIA Music Awards are presented annually from 1987 by the Australian Recording Industry Association (ARIA).

|-
| rowspan="2"| 1998 || rowspan="2"| "Next Time" || ARIA Award for Best New Talent ||  
|-
| ARIA Award for Breakthrough Artist - Single ||  
|-
| 1999 || Real Life || ARIA Award for Breakthrough Artist - Album ||  
|-

Mo Awards
The Australian Entertainment Mo Awards (commonly known informally as the Mo Awards), were annual Australian entertainment industry awards. They recognise achievements in live entertainment in Australia from 1975 to 2016. Marie Wilson won three awards in that time.
 (wins only)
|-
| 1994
| Marie Wilson
| Jazz Vocal Performer of the Year 
| 
|-
| 1998
| Marie Wilson
| Jazz Vocal Performer of the Year 
| 
|-
| 2001
| Marie Wilson
| Jazz Vocal Performer of the Year 
| 
|-

References

External links
Marie Wilson

Australian women singers
Living people
1976 births